Colonel Macbeth Duncan (1 September 1866 – 2 October 1942) was a Scotland international rugby union player. He later became the 48th President of the Scottish Rugby Union.

Rugby Union career

Amateur career

Duncan was schooled at Cargilfield before moving on to Fettes College. He played for Fettesian-Lorettonians.

After Fettes, Duncan went to Clare College, Cambridge University. He played for Cambridge University and captained the side. He obtained his mathematics degree with honours before then studying law at both Aberdeen and Edinburgh universities.

He also played for Aberdeen University while studying law there.

Provincial career

He played for East of Scotland District against West of Scotland District on 26 January 1889.

International career

He was capped once for Scotland in 1888. for a Home Nations match against Wales in Newport.

Administrative career

He was President of the Scottish Rugby Union for the period 1927 to 1928.

Law career

His father Charles Duncan was an advocate and Procurator-Fiscal for Aberdeenshire.

Duncan studied law at both University of Aberdeen and at University of Edinburgh. He served an apprenticeship with Peter Duguid (advocate), Henry Peterkin (solicitor), and with the firm Mackenzie and Cormack in Edinburgh. His brother W. O. Duncan was a partner in the firm with Duguid and Peterkin and so Duncan then joined the firm Duguid, Peterkin and Duncan. On the retirement of Duguid, Macbeth Duncan became a partner and the firm was then called Peterkin and Duncans.

He became a President of the Society of Advocates in Aberdeen from 1928 to 1930. In 1928, he was made Sheriff-Substitute of Aberdeen.

Duncan specialised in merchantile law. He acted for the Board of Trade on their inquiries on the loss of vessels.

Military career

He was chairman of the City of Aberdeen Territorial Army. Duncan held a commission at the local Artillery Corps. In the First World War he was sent to France as head of the 1st Highland Brigade (Royal Artillery). He was decorated with a C. M. G. In 1933, he was made a Honoary Colonel of the 75th Highland Field Brigade in the Royal Artillery (T. A.)

Outside of rugby union, law and military

Duncan was a keen golfer. He became Secretary of Aberdeen Golf Club, a post which he held for 28 years.

He tried to promote a golfing Northern Counties tournament and became the first chairman of the North-East Association of the Scottish Golf Union.

References

1866 births
1942 deaths
People educated at Cargilfield School
People educated at Fettes College
Alumni of Clare College, Cambridge
Scottish rugby union players
Scotland international rugby union players
Fettesian-Lorretonian rugby union players
Presidents of the Scottish Rugby Union
Aberdeen University RFC players
East of Scotland District players
Cambridge R.U.F.C. players
Rugby union players from Aberdeen
Rugby union three-quarters
Military personnel from Aberdeen